Thomas Edison National Historical Park preserves Thomas Edison's laboratory and residence, Glenmont, in West Orange, New Jersey, United States. These were designed, in 1887, by architect Henry Hudson Holly. The Edison laboratories operated for more than 40 years. Out of the West Orange laboratories came the motion picture camera, improved phonographs, sound recordings, silent and sound movies and the nickel-iron alkaline electric storage battery.

Properties

The laboratory complex comprises the industrial facility built by Edison in 1887 to research and develop his inventions. The complex includes more than a dozen buildings that supported Edison's research into electricity, photography, motion pictures, chemistry, metallurgy and other disciplines. A private library was attached to the main laboratory building. Specialty heavy and precision machine shops made tooling and prototypes. Edison's Black Maria was the world's first movie studio, and the building could be rotated on a turntable to keep sunlight on film subjects. It was reconstructed in 1954.

Edison's Queen Anne style home was designed by Henry Hudson Holly and built between 1880 and 1882 for Henry Pedder. It originally comprised 23 rooms. The mansion was built with gravity-convection central heat, indoor flush toilets, and hot and cold piped water. Pedder was found to have embezzled funds from his employer to build Glenmont, and was forced to surrender the estate, which Edison bought in 1886 for $125,000 (equal to $ today), moving in with his newly married second wife Mina and his three children from his first marriage. The house retains its original furnishings in an Eastlake style interior. Edison added six more rooms, and electrical wiring.

Edison's children with Mina grew up at Glenmont, including future New Jersey governor Charles Edison and industrialist Theodore Miller Edison

History

Edison's home was designated as the Edison Home National Historic Site on December 6, 1955.  The laboratory was designated as Edison Laboratory National Monument on July 14, 1956.  On September 5, 1962, the  site containing the home and the laboratory were designated the Edison National Historic Site.  On March 30, 2009, it was renamed Thomas Edison National Historical Park, adding "Thomas" to the title in hopes to relieve confusion between the Edison sites in West Orange and Edison, New Jersey.  Following extensive renovations of the laboratory complex, there was a grand reopening on October 10, 2009.

In popular culture
In 1996, the alternative rock band They Might Be Giants recorded four songs on phonograph cylinder at the museum. One of these recordings, of the song "I Can Hear You", appeared on their album Factory Showroom released later the same year. The other three songs ("Maybe I Know", "The Edison Museum", and a re-recording of the Factory 
Showroom track "James K. Polk") were released on the band's website in 2002.

See also

Edison State Park
Thomas Alva Edison Memorial Tower and Museum
National Register of Historic Places listings in Essex County, New Jersey
Edison Storage Battery Company Building
List of museums in New Jersey

References

External links

Thomas Edison National Historical Park - official site
Stained glass restoration National Park Service

Thomas Edison
Historic house museums in New Jersey
West Orange, New Jersey
Protected areas established in 1962
Museums in Essex County, New Jersey
Edison
Technology museums in New Jersey
Industry museums in New Jersey
National Historical Parks in New Jersey
Historic American Buildings Survey in New Jersey
Historic American Engineering Record in New Jersey
Houses in Essex County, New Jersey
Science museums in New Jersey
Parks in Essex County, New Jersey
Historic districts in Essex County, New Jersey
Historic districts on the National Register of Historic Places in New Jersey
National Historical Parks of the United States